The Bristow Tire Shop, at 115 W. Fourth St. in Bristow, Oklahoma, was built in 1923.  It was listed on the National Register of Historic Places in 1995.

It was a filling station with a gas pump.

See also
Bristow Firestone Service Station

References

Gas stations on the National Register of Historic Places in Oklahoma
National Register of Historic Places in Creek County, Oklahoma
Renaissance Revival architecture in Oklahoma
Commercial buildings completed in 1923